Louis Georges Gouy (February 19, 1854 – January 27, 1926) was a French physicist. He is the namesake of the Gouy balance, the Gouy–Chapman electric double layer model (which is a relatively successful albeit limited model that describes the electrical double-layer which finds applications in vast areas of studies from physical chemistry to biophysics) and the Gouy phase.

Gouy was born at Vals-les-Bains, Ardèche in 1854. He became a correspondent of the Académie des sciences in 1901, and a member in 1913.

Topics investigated
His principal scientific work was related to the following subjects:
 The propagation velocity of light waves in dispersive media.
 Propagation of spherical waves of small radius. 
 Distant diffraction (angles of dispersion reaching 150°) 
 Electrostatics: Inductive capacity of dielectrics 
 Surface charge
 Effect of the magnetic field on the discharge in rarefied gases
 Electrocapillarity
 Emission capacity of absorbent of the coloured flames 
 Brownian motion
 Measurement of magnetic susceptibility of transition metal complexes with Gouy balance
 The gouy phase shift, a feature of Gaussian beams.

See also
Gouy-Stodola theorem

References

Further reading
 L. G. Gouy La Nature n°2708 du 27 février 1926
 A Sella, Gouy's Balance, Chemistry World, December 2010

1854 births
1926 deaths
People from Ardèche
Experimental physicists
French physicists
Members of the French Academy of Sciences